Ayyo is a village in northern Syria, administratively part of the Hama Governorate, located south of Hama. Nearby localities include Kafr Buhum to the northwest, al-Khalidiyah to the north, Maarin al-Jabal to the northeast, al-Buraq to the east, Nisrin to the southeast and al-Biyah and Birin to the southwest. According to the Syria Central Bureau of Statistics, Ayyo had a population of 1,980 in the 2004 census. Its inhabitants are predominantly Christians.

References

Populated places in Hama District
Christian communities in Syria